Hylaeamys is a genus of South American oryzomyine rodents found principally in humid forested areas east of the Andes. The species in this genus have historically been placed in Oryzomys. They are most closely related to Euryoryzomys, Transandinomys, Nephelomys, Oecomys, and Handleyomys, and most closely resemble species of the former two genera. They are distinguished from members of Euryoryzomys by all-dark or indistinct two-tone tail coloration (as opposed to the distinct two-tone tail coloration of Euryoryzomys), from members of Transandinomys by having shorter whiskers above their eyes that do not extend posteriorly behind their ears, and in both cases by differences in carotid circulation. The genus is named after hylaea ("forest" in Greek), the term used by Humboldt for the lowland South American rainforests that are the main habitat of the genus.

The genus currently comprises the following species:
 Hylaeamys acritus
 Hylaeamys laticeps
 Hylaeamys megacephalus
 Hylaeamys oniscus
 Hylaeamys perenensis
 Hylaeamys tatei
 Hylaeamys yunganus

References
 

 
Rodent genera
Taxa named by Marcelo Weksler
Taxa named by Alexandre Reis Percequillo